The Portugal national under-20 football team is the national under-20 football team of Portugal and is controlled by the Portuguese Football Federation, the governing body for football in Portugal.

The U20 team acts mainly as a feeder team for the under-21s and provides further international development for youth players. The team qualified for its only official match, FIFA U-20 World Cup, depends on U19 results.

The Portuguese team has 12 participations in the FIFA U-20 World Cup and 12 in the Toulon Tournament.

History

The Golden Generation (1989–1991)
The Golden Generation was the Generation of the players that won consecutive FIFA Youth Championships in 1989 and 1991.

The Silver Generation (2011)
The Courage Generation was the Generation of players that was runner up in the 2011 FIFA U-20 World Cup.

Competitive record

FIFA U-20 World Cup

*Denotes draws include knockout matches decided on penalty kicks.
**Gold background colour indicates that the tournament was won.
***Red border color indicates tournament was held on home soil.

Toulon Tournament

* Portugal also participated in the 1975, 1976, 1977, 1981, 1982, 1986, 1987, 1990, 1992, 1993, and 2009 tournaments but with the u-21 squad instead of the u-20 squad.

Honours

Team
 FIFA U-20 World Cup
 Winner (2): 1989, 1991
 Runner-up  (1): 2011
 Third place (1): 1995
 Toulon Tournament
 Winner (3): 1992, 2001, 2003
 Runner-up (4): 1994, 1997, 2000, 2005
 Third place (4): 1998, 2006, 2014, 2016
Torneio Internacional da Madeira
 Winner (7): 1997, 2000, 2002, 2003, 2005, 2007, 2008
 Runner-up (4): 1998, 2001, 2004, 2006
 Torneio Campos Verdes
 Winner (2): 2007, 2008
 Copa El Presidente de La Republica - Ricardo Martinelli
 Third place (1): 2011
 SBS Cup International Youth Soccer
 Runner-up (1): 2012
 Elite League U20
 Runner-up (1): 2018-19

Individual awards
 FIFA U-20 World Cup

 

 Toulon Tournament

Players

Current squad 
 The following players were called up for the friendly match and the 2022–23 Under 20 Elite League match.
 Match dates: 19 and 22 November 2022
 Opposition:  and 
 Caps and goals correct as of: 27 September 2022, after the match against .

Previous squads 

FIFA U-20 World Cup

1979 FIFA U-20 World Cup squads - Portugal
1989 FIFA U-20 World Cup squads - Portugal
1991 FIFA U-20 World Cup squads - Portugal
1993 FIFA U-20 World Cup squads - Portugal
1995 FIFA U-20 World Cup squads - Portugal
1999 FIFA U-20 World Cup squads - Portugal
2007 FIFA U-20 World Cup squads - Portugal
2011 FIFA U-20 World Cup squads - Portugal
2013 FIFA U-20 World Cup squads - Portugal
2015 FIFA U-20 World Cup squads - Portugal
2017 FIFA U-20 World Cup squads - Portugal

Toulon Tournament
2007 Toulon Tournament squads - Portugal
2011 Toulon Tournament squads - Portugal

Most appearances

Most goals

Notable players

 Luís Figo
 Rui Costa
 Fernando Couto
 Jorge Costa
 João Vieira Pinto
 Paulo Alves
 Paulo Sousa
 Nuno Capucho
 Rui Bento
 Emílio Peixe
 Abel Xavier
 Cristiano Ronaldo

Head coaches
As of 2022

References

F
European national under-20 association football teams